Jane Lynch is an American actress.

She is known for her comedic work in film and television in particular Glee (2010-2015), and The Marvelous Mrs. Maisel (2017–present). For playing Sue Sylvester in Glee, she won a Primetime Emmy Award, Golden Globe Award, Screen Actors Guild Award, TCA Award, Satellite Award, and People's Choice Award. Lynch has received five Primetime Emmy Awards from thirteen nominations, two Screen Actors Guild Awards from six nominations, and a Golden Globe Award from two nominations.

Main associations

Emmy Awards

Golden Globe Awards

Screen Actors Guild Awards

Audience awards

Teen Choice Awards

People's Choice Awards

Critics awards

Critics' Choice Awards

Television Critics Association Awards

Gotham Independent Film Awards

Florida Film Critics Circle

Phoenix Film Critics Society Awards

Ft. Lauderdale International Film Festival

Miscellaneous awards

Dorian Awards

Satellite Awards

Honors

Hollywood Walk of Fame

References 

Lynch, Jane